Urko González de Zarate Quirós (born 20 March 2001) is a Spanish professional footballer who plays as a defender for Real Sociedad B.

Club career
González de Zárate was born in Vitoria-Gasteiz, Álava, Basque Country, and was a Real Sociedad youth graduate. He made his senior debut with the C-team on 3 February 2019, coming on as a second-half substitute in a 2–2 Tercera División away draw against CD Santurtzi.

González de Zárate was definitely promoted to the C's ahead of the 2019–20 season, and subsequently became a regular starter for the side. On 1 July 2020, he renewed his contract until 2024, and was promoted to the reserves in Segunda División B.

González de Zárate made his first team – and La Liga – debut on 20 September 2020, replacing Ander Guevara late into a 0–0 home draw against Real Madrid.

References

External links

2001 births
Living people
Footballers from Vitoria-Gasteiz
Spanish footballers
Association football defenders
La Liga players
Tercera División players
Real Sociedad C footballers
Real Sociedad B footballers
Real Sociedad footballers
Spain under-21 international footballers